Karl Hilding Sonne (April 8, 1890 – April 20, 1938) was a Swedish track and field athlete who competed in the 1912 Summer Olympics. In 1912 he finished eleventh in the javelin throw competition and 14th in the two handed javelin throw event.

References

External links
profile 

1890 births
1938 deaths
Swedish male javelin throwers
Olympic athletes of Sweden
Athletes (track and field) at the 1912 Summer Olympics